Türkmenbaşy Ruhy Mosque, or Gypjak Mosque, is a mosque in Gypjak, Turkmenistan and the resting place for Saparmyrat Nyýazow, the leader of Turkmenistan from 1985 to 2006.

Overview

The mosque, constructed by the French company Bouygues, was built in the home town of President Saparmyrat Nyýazow. It opened on 22 October 2004, and was built by Nyýazow with a mausoleum in preparation for his death. Nyýazow died two years later, and was buried in the mausoleum on 24 December 2006.

The mosque has been at the center of controversy as scriptures from both the Quran and the Ruhnama (The Book of the Soul), Nyýazow's 'pseudo-spiritual guide to life' are built into the walls. It has outraged many Muslims that the Ruhnama is placed as the Koran's equal. Indeed, despite its capacity to accommodate 10,000 congregants, the mosque is often empty as the Ruhnama inscriptions are considered blasphemous by devout mosquegoers.

See also
Ertuğrul Gazi Mosque
Gurbanguly Hajji Mosque

Notes

References

2004 establishments in Turkmenistan
Gypjak
Mosques in Turkmenistan
Mosques completed in 2004
21st-century mosques
Saparmyrat Nyýazow